Insel may refer to:

Arts and entertainment
 Insel (album), a 2014 album by German band Juli
 Die Insel (disambiguation), three German magazines
 Insel: The Queen Charlotte Islands Meditations, a 1983 book by Canadian author J. Michael Yates
 Insel Verlag, a German book publisher, primarily of arts and literary material

People with the surname
 Ayşe Şekibe İnsel (1886–1970), Turkish politician
 Paul A. Insel (born 1945), American pharmacologist
 Thomas R. Insel (born 1951), American neuroscientist

Other uses
 Insel, Saxony-Anhalt, a German village
 Insel Air, a Dutch Caribbean carrier
 Mount Insel, a mountain in Victoria Land, Antarctica

See also
 "Eine Insel für zwei", 1961 single by American singer Connie Francis
 Entdeckung der blauen Grotte auf der Insel Capri, an 1838 German book
 Nordwestliche Insel Mountains, an Antarctic mountain range
 Rote Insel, a district in Berlin, Germany